Seo Jeong-yeon (born September 23, 1975) is a South Korean actress. She has starred in television series such as Righteous Love (2014) and Descendants of the Sun (2016) and had supporting roles in dramas including Something in the Rain (2018).

Filmography

Film

Television series

Web series

Awards and nominations

References

External links
 
 

Living people
South Korean television actresses
South Korean stage actresses
South Korean web series actresses
YG Entertainment artists
1975 births